Wendy Ann Achieng Asol (born 12 September 1993), known as Wendy Achieng, is a Kenyan footballer who plays as a left back. She has been a member of the Kenya women's national team.

International career
Achieng captained Kenya at the 2016 Africa Women Cup of Nations.

See also
List of Kenya women's international footballers

References

1993 births
Living people
People from Bungoma County
Kenyan women's footballers
Women's association football fullbacks
Kenya women's international footballers